Liam Mitchell (born 10 October 1995) is a New Zealand rugby union player who plays for the Japan Rugby League One team Saitama Wild Knights. His playing position is lock. 

He played for the Hurricanes, from 2019 to 2021, in Super Rugby and Manawatu Turbos, from 2017 season.
He played for Italian United Rugby Championship team Zebre in 2021−2022 season.

Reference list

External links
itsrugby.co.uk profile

1995 births
New Zealand rugby union players
Living people
Rugby union locks
Manawatu rugby union players
Hurricanes (rugby union) players
Zebre Parma players
Rugby union players from Palmerston North
Saitama Wild Knights players